The Brunswick Lion is a medieval sculpture, created in bronze between 1164 and 1176, and the best-known landmark in the German city of Brunswick. The Brunswick Lion was originally located on the Burgplatz square in front of the Brunswick Cathedral. The monument was moved to Dankwarderode Castle in 1980, and later replaced at the original location by a replica. Within Brunswick, it is commonly known as the "Castle Lion" (Burglöwe).

Statue

Creation

The medieval chronicler Abbot Albert of Stade mentioned "1166" as the year of origin. Nevertheless, according to recent research, the monument was created between 1164 and 1176, at the time when the Welf duke Henry the Lion (1129/31–1195), ruler of both Saxony and Bavaria, took his residence at Braunschweig. Newly-married with the English princess Matilda, he had Dankwarderode Castle built in the style of a Kaiserpfalz, rivalling with the nearby Imperial Palace of Goslar. The lion statue was erected in the centre of the castle complex as seigniorial symbol of his ducal authority and jurisdiction, probably also as an expression of Henry's claim to power towards the Hohenstaufen emperor Frederick Barbarossa.

The Brunswick Lion was the first large detached sculpture of the Middle Ages north of the Alps and the first large hollow casting of a figure since antiquity. The sculpture was originally gilded.

The Lion's design apparently is modelled on Italian art of sculpture, such as the Capitoline Wolf, the Lion of Saint Mark, or the ancient Equestrian Statue of Marcus Aurelius. Henry may have been inspired during the Italian campaigns he undertook together with Emperor Frederick Barbarossa. The elaborate artistic achievement and naturalistic design of the sculpture indicate the work of a versed goldsmith or bell founder.

History

The Lion soon became the heraldic animal of Braunschweig; it appeared in the city's seal and on ducal coins. The sculpture and its pedestal were extensively restored in 1616, under the rule of Duke Frederick Ulrich of Brunswick-Wolfenbüttel, after long quarrels with the Braunschweig citizens were settled. During the Napoleonic Wars, it was narrowly rescued from melting down when the Westphalian government prepared for the 1812 Russian Campaign. Another restoration was carried out by the sculptor Georg Ferdinand Howaldt in 1858. 

The Braunschweig Büssing automotive company established in 1903 adopted the Lion as a logo mounted on its busses and trucks. Taken over by MAN SE in 1972, the Büssing signet still adorns MAN commercial vehicles.

The threat by strategic bombing during World War II prompted the city administration to replace the original sculpture by a copy already cast in 1937. Kept safe at the Rammelsberg mines in the Harz mountains, the original statue was brought back to Braunschweig by the British occupation forces after the war and re-installed in a festive ceremony.

Finally in 1980, the original statue was removed inside Dankwarderode Castle to protect it from further damages caused by air pollution. A specially manufactured replica has been set up at the original site.

Legend
Shortly after the death of Henry the Lion in 1195, the duke became the subject of a folktale, the so-called Heinrichssage. The tale was later also turned into the opera Enrico Leone by Italian composer Agostino Steffani. The Heinrichssage details a fictional account of Henry's pilgrimage to the Holy Land. A popular part of the tale deals with the Brunswick Lion. According to legend, Henry witnessed the fight between a lion and a dragon while on pilgrimage. He joins the lion in its fight and they slay the dragon. The faithful lion then accompanies Henry on his return home. After its master's death, the lion refuses all food and dies of grief on Henry's grave. The people of Brunswick then erect the statue in the lion's honour.

Replicas
Around the world, but mainly in Germany, there are several replicas of the Brunswick Lion. For example, in front of Ratzeburg Cathedral (erected in 1881), in the interior of Weingarten Abbey, in front of Wiligrad Castle, set up in 1913/14 by John Albert of Mecklenburg (from 1907 to 1913 ruler of the Duchy of Brunswick), disappeared after 1950, in Blankenburg im Harz in 1915 on the terrace of the Great Castle, since 1953 in the Baroque Gardens of the Little Castle and in the Victoria and Albert Museum in London. Other replicas are located here:

Gallery

References

Sources
 Reinhard Bein und Bernhardine Vogel: Nachkriegszeit. Das Braunschweiger Land 1945 bis 1950. Materialien zur Landesgeschichte. Braunschweig 1995
 Braunschweiger Zeitung (Hrsg.): Die 100 größten Braunschweiger, Braunschweig 2005
 Cay Friemuth: Die geraubte Kunst. Der dramatische Wettlauf um die Rettung der Kulturschätze nach dem Zweiten Weltkrieg, Braunschweig 1989
 Martin Gosebruch (Hrsg.): Der Braunschweiger Löwe. Bericht über ein wissenschaftliches Symposion in Braunschweig vom 12.10. bis 15. Oktober 1983. In: Schriftenreihe der Kommission für Niedersächsische Bau- und Kunstgeschichte bei der Braunschweigischen Wissenschaftlichen Gesellschaft. Göttingen 1985
 Mathias Haenchen: Der Sockel des Braunschweiger Löwenmonuments, in: Braunschweigische Heimat – Zeitschrift des Landesvereins für Heimatschutz im Herzogtum Braunschweig, Bd. 84 (1998), S. 8 – 10
 Karl Jordan, Martin Gosebruch: 800 Jahre Braunschweiger Burglöwe 1166 – 1966. Braunschweig 1967
 Jochen Luckhardt und Franz Niehoff (Hrsg.): Heinrich der Löwe und seine Zeit. Herrschaft und Repräsentation der Welfen 1125 – 1235. Katalog der Ausstellung, Braunschweig 1995
 Gerd Spies (Hrsg.): Braunschweig – Das Bild der Stadt in 900 Jahren. Geschichte und Ansichten. Ausstellungskatalog, Braunschweig 1985
 Gerd Spies (Hrsg.): Der Braunschweig Löwe. In: Braunschweiger Werkstücke, Band 62, Braunschweig 1985
 Städtisches Museum Braunschweig (Hrsg.): „Geschichte der Stadt Braunschweig“ im Altstadtrathaus. Ausstellungskatalog, Braunschweig 1991
 Reinhart Staats: Der Braunschweiger Löwe in biblischer Bedeutung. In: Quellen und Beiträge zur Geschichte der Evangelisch-Lutherischen Landeskirche in Braunschweig. Heft 10, Wolfenbüttel 2002

External links
 
 

12th-century sculptures
Animal monuments
Braunschweig
Bronze sculptures
Culture in Braunschweig
History of Brunswick
Brunswick
Medieval European sculptures
Monuments and memorials in Germany
Mythological lions
Romanesque sculptures
Brunswick
Tourist attractions in Lower Saxony
German legendary creatures